Linear Tape-Open (LTO) is a magnetic tape data storage technology originally developed in the late 1990s as an open standards alternative to the proprietary magnetic tape formats that were available at the time. Hewlett Packard Enterprise, IBM, and Quantum control the LTO Consortium, which directs development and manages licensing and certification of media and mechanism manufacturers.

The standard form-factor of LTO technology goes by the name Ultrium, the original version of which was released in 2000 and stored  of data in a cartridge. The ninth generation of LTO Ultrium was announced in 2020 and can hold  in a cartridge of the same physical size.

Upon introduction, LTO Ultrium rapidly defined the super tape market segment and has consistently been the best-selling super tape format. LTO is widely used with small and large computer systems, especially for backup.

History 

Starting in the 1950s, half-inch (12.7 mm) magnetic tape on open reels has been used for data storage since the 1950s, starting with the IBM 7 track and later IBM 9 track. 

In the mid-1980s, IBM and DEC put this kind of tape into a single reel, enclosed cartridge. Although the physical tape was nominally the same size, the technologies and intended markets were significantly different and there was no compatibility between them. IBM called its format the 3480 (after the 3480, the one product that used it) and designed it to meet the demanding requirements of its mainframe products. DEC originally called theirs CompacTape, but later it was renamed DLT and sold to Quantum Corporation. 

In the late 1980s, Exabyte's Data8 format, derived from Sony's dual-reel cartridge 8 mm video format, saw some popularity, especially with UNIX systems. Sony followed this success with their own now-discontinued 8 mm data format, Advanced Intelligent Tape (AIT).

By the late 1990s, Quantum's DLT and Sony's AIT were the leading options for high-capacity tape storage for PC servers and UNIX systems. These technologies were (and still are) tightly controlled by their owners. Consequently, there was little competition between vendors and the prices were relatively high.

To counter this, IBM, HP and Seagate formed the LTO Consortium, which introduced a more open format focusing on the same mid-range market segment. Much of the technology is an extension of the work done by IBM at its Tucson lab during the previous 20 years. Initial plans called for two LTO formats: Ultrium with half-inch tape on a single reel, optimized for high capacity, and Accelis with 8 mm tape on dual reels, optimized for low latency.

In 2000, and around the time of the release of LTO-1, Seagate's magnetic tape division was spun off as Seagate Removable Storage Solutions, later renamed Certance, which was subsequently acquired by Quantum.

Generations 

Despite the initial plans for two form-factors of LTO technology, only Ultrium was ever produced. The other proposed format was Accelis, developed in 1997 for fast access to data by using a two-reel cartridge that loads at the midpoint of the 8 mm wide tape to minimize access time. IBM's (short-lived) 3570 Magstar MP product pioneered this concept. The real-world performance never exceeded that of the Ultrium tape format, so there was never a demand for Accelis and no drives or media were commercially produced. As of 2008, LTO Ultrium was very popular and there were no commercially available LTO Accelis drives or media. In common usage, LTO generally refers only to the Ultrium form factor.

The first generation of Ultrium tapes were going to be available with four types of cartridge, holding 10 GB, 30 GB, 50 GB, and 100 GB. Only the full length 100 GB tapes were produced.

As of 2020, nine generations of LTO Ultrium technology have been made available and five more are planned. Between generations, there are strict compatibility rules that describe how and which drives and cartridges can be used together.

While data capacity and speed figures vary with uncompressed or compressed data, most manufacturers list compressed capacities and speeds on their marketing material. Capacities are often stated on tapes as double the actual value, assume that data will be compressed with a 2:1 ratio (IBM uses a 3:1 compression ratio in the documentation for its mainframe tape drives. Sony uses a 2.6:1 ratio for SAIT). See Compression below for algorithm descriptions and the table above for allowable LTO compression ratios.

The units for data capacity and data transfer rates generally follow the "decimal" SI prefix convention (e.g. mega = 106), not the binary interpretation of a decimal prefix (e.g. mega = 220).

Minimum and maximum reading and writing speeds are drive-dependent.

Drives usually support variable-speed operation to dynamically match the data rate flow. This nearly eliminates tape backhitching or "shoe-shining", maximizing overall throughput and device/tape life.

Compatibility 

In contrast to other tape technologies, an Ultrium cartridge is rigidly defined by a particular generation of LTO technology and cannot be used in any other way (with the exception of LTO-M8, see below). While Ultrium drives are also defined by a particular generation, they are required to have some level of compatibility with older generations of cartridges. The rules for compatibility between generations of drives and cartridges are as follows:

 Up to and including LTO-7, an Ultrium drive can read data from a cartridge in its own generation and the two prior generations. LTO-8 drives can read LTO-7 and LTO-8 tape, but not LTO-6 tape.
 An Ultrium drive can write data to a cartridge in its own generation and to a cartridge from the one prior generation in the prior generation's format.
 Some LTO-8 drives may write previously unused LTO-7 tapes with an increased, uncompressed capacity of 9 TB (Type M (M8)). Only new, unused LTO-7 cartridges may be initialized as LTO-7 Type M. Once a cartridge is initialized as Type M it may not be changed back to a 6 TB LTO-7 cartridge. LTO-7 Type M cartridges are only initialized to Type M in an LTO-8 drive. LTO-7 drives are not capable of reading LTO-7 Type M cartridges.
 An Ultrium drive cannot make any use of a cartridge from a more recent generation.

For example, an LTO-2 cartridge can never be used by an LTO-1 drive and even though it can be used in an LTO-3 drive, it performs as if it were in an LTO-2 drive.

Within the compatibility rules stated above, drives and cartridges from different vendors are expected to be interchangeable. For example, a tape written on any one vendor's drive should be fully readable on any other vendor's drive that is compatible with that generation of LTO.

Core technology

Tape specifications

Physical structure 

LTO Ultrium tape is laid out with four wide data bands sandwiched between five narrow servo bands. The tape head assembly, that reads from and writes to the tape, straddles a single data band and the two adjacent servo bands. The tape head has 8, 16, or 32 data read/write head elements and 2 servo read elements. The set of 8, 16, or 32 tracks are read or written in a single, one-way, end-to-end pass that is called a "wrap". The tape head shifts laterally to access the different wraps within each band and also to access the other bands.

Writing to a blank tape starts at band 0, wrap 0, a forward wrap that runs from the beginning of the tape (BOT) to the end of the tape (EOT) and includes a track that runs along one side of the data band. The next wrap written, band 0, wrap 1, is a reverse wrap (EOT to BOT) and includes a track along the other side of the band. Wraps continue in forward and reverse passes, with slight shifts toward the middle of the band on each pass. The tracks written on each pass partially overlap the tracks written on the previous wrap of the same direction, like roof shingles. The back and forth pattern, working from the edges into the middle, conceptually resembles a coiled serpent and is known as linear serpentine recording.

When the first data band is filled (they are filled in 3, 1, 0, 2 order across the tape), the head assembly is moved to the second data band and a new set of wraps is written in the same linear serpentine manner. The total number of tracks on the tape is (4 data bands) × (11 to 52 wraps per band) × (8, 16, or 32 tracks per wrap). For example, an LTO-2 tape has 16 wraps per band, and thus requires 64 passes to fill.

Logical structure 

Since LTFS is an open standard, LTFS-formatted tapes are usable by a wide variety of computing systems.

The block structure of the tape is logical so interblock gaps, file marks, tape marks and so forth take only a few bytes each. In LTO-1 and LTO-2, this logical structure has CRC codes and compression added to create blocks of 403,884 bytes. Another chunk of 468 bytes of information (including statistics and information about the drive that wrote the data and when it was written) is then added to create a "dataset". Finally error correction bytes are added to bring the total size of the dataset to 491,520 bytes (480 KiB) before it is written in a specific format across the eight heads. LTO-3 and LTO-4 use a similar format with 1,616,940-byte blocks.

The tape drives use a strong error correction algorithm that makes data recovery possible when lost data is within one track. Also, when data is written to the tape it is verified by reading it back using the read heads that are positioned just "behind" the write heads. This allows the drive to write a second copy of any data that fails the verify without the help of the host system.

Positioning times 

While specifications vary somewhat between different drives, a typical LTO-3 drive will have a maximum rewind time of about 80 seconds and an average access time (from beginning of tape) of about 50 seconds. Because of the serpentine writing, rewinding often takes less time than the maximum. If a tape is written to full capacity, there is no rewind time, since the last pass is a reverse pass leaving the head at the beginning of the tape (number of tracks ÷ tracks written per pass is always an even number).

Durability 

LTO tape is designed for 15 to 30 years of archival storage. If tapes are archived for longer than 6 months they have to be stored at a temperature between 16 and 25 °C (61 to 77 °F) and between 20 – 50% RH.
Both drives and media should be kept free from airborne dust or other contaminants from packing and storage materials, paper dust, cardboard particles, printer toner dust etc.

Depending on the generation of LTO technology, a single LTO tape should be able to sustain approximately 200-364 full file passes. There is a large amount of lifespan variability in actual use. One full file pass is equal to writing enough data to fill an entire tape and takes between 44 and 208 end-to-end passes. Regularly writing only 50% capacity of the tape results in half as many end-to-end tape passes for each scheduled backup, and thereby doubles the tape lifespan. LTO uses an automatic verify-after-write technology to immediately check the data as it is being written, but some backup systems explicitly perform a completely separate tape reading operation to verify the tape was written correctly. This separate verify operation doubles the number of end-to-end passes for each scheduled backup, and reduces the tape life by half.

Optional technology 

The original release of LTO technology defined an optional data compression feature. Subsequent generations of LTO have introduced new optional technology, including WORM, encryption, and partitioning features.

 Compression The original LTO specification describes a data compression method LTO-DC, also called Streaming Lossless Data Compression (SLDC). It is very similar to the algorithm ALDC which is a variation of LZS. LTO-1 through LTO-5 are advertised as achieving a "2:1" compression ratio, while LTO-6 and LTO-7, which apply a modified SLDC algorithm using a larger history buffer, are advertised as having a "2.5:1" ratio. This is inferior to slower algorithms such as gzip, but similar to lzop and the high speed algorithms built into other tape drives. The actually achievable ratio generally depends on the compressibility of the data, e.g. for precompressed data such as ZIP files, JPEG images, and MPEG video or audio the ratio will be close to or equal to 1:1.
 WORM New for LTO-3 was write once read many (WORM) capability. This is useful for legal record keeping, and for protection from accidental or intentional erasure, for example from ransomware, or simply human error. An LTO-3 or later drive will not erase or overwrite data on a WORM cartridge, but will read it. A WORM cartridge is identical to a normal tape cartridge of the same generation with the following exceptions: the cartridge memory identifies it to the drive as WORM, the servo tracks are slightly different to allow verification that data has not been modified, the bottom half of the cartridge shell is gray, and it may come with tamper-proof screws. WORM-capable drives immediately recognize WORM cartridges and include a unique WORM ID with every dataset written to the tape. There is nothing different about the tape medium in a WORM cartridge.
 Encryption The LTO-4 specification added a feature to allow LTO-4 drives to encrypt data before it is written to tape. All LTO-4 drives must be aware of encrypted tapes, but are not required to support the encryption process. All current LTO manufacturers support encryption natively enabled in the tape drives using Application Managed Encryption (AME). The algorithm used by LTO-4 is AES-GCM, which is an authenticated, symmetric block cipher. The same key is used to encrypt and decrypt data, and the algorithm can detect tampering with the data. Tape drives, tape libraries, and backup software can request and exchange encryption keys using either proprietary protocols, or an open standard like OASIS's Key Management Interoperability Protocol.
 Partitioning The LTO-5 specification introduced the partitioning feature that allows a tape to be divided into two separately writable areas, known as partitions. LTO-6 extends the specification to allow 4 separate partitions. The Linear Tape File System (LTFS) is a self-describing tape format and file system made possible by the partition feature. File data and filesystem metadata are stored in separate partitions on the tape. The metadata, which uses a standard XML schema, is readable by any LTFS-aware system and can be modified separately from the data it describes. The Linear Tape File System Technical Work Group of the Storage Networking Industry Association (SNIA) works on the development of the format for LTFS. Without LTFS, data is generally written to tape as a sequence of nameless "files", or data blocks, separated by "filemarks". Each file is typically an archive of data organized using some variation of tar format or proprietary container formats developed for and used by backup programs. In contrast, LTFS utilizes an XML-based index file to present the copied files as if organized into directories. This means LTFS-formatted tape media can be used similarly to other removable media (USB flash drive, external hard disk drive, and so on). While LTFS can make a tape appear to behave like a disk, it does not change the fundamentally sequential nature of tape. Files are always appended to the end of the tape. If a file is modified and overwritten or removed from the volume, the associated tape blocks used are not freed up: they are simply marked as unavailable, and the used volume capacity is not recovered. Data is deleted and capacity recovered only if the whole tape is reformatted. In spite of these disadvantages, there are several use cases where LTFS-formatted tape is superior to disk and other data storage technologies. While LTO seek times can range from 10 to 100 seconds, the streaming data transfer rate can match or exceed disk data transfer rates. Additionally, LTO cartridges are easily transportable and the latest generation can hold more data than other removable data storage formats. The ability to copy a large file or a large selection of files (up to 1.5 TB for LTO-5 or 2.5 TB for LTO-6) to an LTFS-formatted tape, allows easy exchange of data to a collaborator or saving of an archival copy.

Cartridges 

, only Fujifilm and Sony continue to manufacture current LTO media.

Compliance-verified licensed manufacturers of LTO technology media at one time were EMTEC, Imation, Fujifilm, Maxell, TDK, and Sony. All other brands of media are manufactured by these companies under contract. Since its bankruptcy in 2003, EMTEC no longer manufactures LTO media products. Imation ended all magnetic tape production in 2011, but continued making cartridges using TDK tape. They later withdrew from all data storage markets, and changed their name to Glassbridge Enterprises in 2017. TDK withdrew from the data tape business in 2014. Verbatim and Quantegy both licensed LTO technology, but never manufactured their own compliance-verified media. Maxell also withdrew from the market.

In addition to the data cartridges, there are also Universal Cleaning Cartridges (UCC), which work with all drives.

Dimensions 

All formats use the same cartridge dimensions, .

Colors 
The colors of LTO Ultrium cartridge shells are mostly consistent, though not formally standardized; HP is the notable exception. Sometimes similar, rather than identical, colors are used by different manufacturers (slate-blue and blue-gray; green, teal, and blue-green; dark red and burgundy).

WORM (write once, read many) cartridges are two-tone: the top half of the shell is the normal color of that generation for that manufacturer, and the bottom half of the shell is a light gray.

Memory 

Every LTO cartridge has a cartridge memory chip inside it. It is made up of 511, 255, or 128 blocks of memory, where each block is 32 bytes for a total of 16 KiB for LTO-6 to 8; 8 KiB for LTO-4 and 5; and 4 KiB on LTO-1 to 3 and cleaning cartridges. This memory can be read or written, one block at a time, via a non-contacting passive 13.56 MHz RF interface. This memory is used to identify tapes, to help drives discriminate between different generations of the technology, and to store tape-use information. Every LTO drive has a cartridge memory reader in it. The non-contact interface has a range of 20 mm. External readers are available, both built into tape libraries and PC based. One such reader, Veritape, connects by USB to a PC and integrates with analytical software to evaluate the quality of tapes. This device is also rebranded as the Spectra MLM Reader and the Maxell LTO Cartridge Memory Analyzer. Proxmark3 and other generic RFID readers are also able to read data.

Labels 

The LTO cartridge label in tape library applications commonly uses the bar code symbology of USS-39. A description and definition is available from the Automatic Identification Manufacturers (AIM) specification Uniform Symbol Specification (USS-39) and the ANSI MH10.8M-1993 ANSI Barcode specification.

Leader pin 

The tape inside an LTO cartridge is wound around a single reel. The end of the tape is attached to a perpendicular leader pin that is used by an LTO drive to reliably grasp the end of the tape and mount it in a take-up reel inside the drive. Older single-reel tape technologies, such as 9 track tape and DLT, used different means to load tape onto a take-up reel. When a cartridge is not in a drive, the pin is held in place at the opening of the cartridge with a small spring. A common reason for a cartridge failing to load into a drive is the misplacement of the leader pin as a result of the cartridge having been dropped. The plastic slot where the pin is normally held is deformed by the drop and the leader pin is no longer in the position that the drive expects it to be.

Erasing 
The magnetic servo tracks on the tape are factory encoded. Using a bulk eraser, degaussing, or otherwise exposing the cartridge to a strong magnetic field, will erase the servo tracks along with the data tracks, rendering the cartridge unusable. Erasing the data tracks without destroying the servo tracks requires special equipment. The erasing head used in these erasers has four magnetic poles that match the width and the location of the data bands. The gaps between the poles correspond to the servo tracks, which are not erased. Tapes erased by this equipment can be recorded again.

Cleaning 

Although keeping a tape drive clean is important, normal cleaning cartridges are abrasive and frequent use will shorten the drive's lifespan. LTO drives have an internal tape head cleaning brush that is activated when a cartridge is inserted. When a more thorough cleaning is required the drive signals this on its display and/or via Tape Alert flags. Cleaning cartridge lifespan is usually from 15 to 50 cleanings. There are 2 basic methods of initiating a cleaning of a drive: robot cleaning and software cleaning. In addition to keeping the tape drive clean, it is also important to keep the media clean. Debris on the media can be deposited onto drive components that are in contact with the tape. This debris can result in increased media wear which generates more debris. Removing excessive debris from tape can reduce the number of data errors. Cleaning of the media requires special equipment. These cleaners are also used by Spectra Logic to clean new media that is marketed as "CarbideClean" media. HP LTO Gen.1 drives have a cleaning strategy that will prevent the drive from using the cleaning tape if it is not needed. In a change of strategy, HP LTO Gen 2, 3 and 4 drives will always clean when a Universal Cleaning Cartridge is inserted, whether the drive requires cleaning or not.

Mechanisms 
, compliance-verified licensed manufacturers of current LTO technology mechanisms are IBM, Hewlett-Packard, and Quantum, although both Hewlett Packard and Quantum have stopped new development of drive mechanisms. The mechanisms, also known as tape drives or streamers, are available in Full-height and Half-height form factors. These drives are frequently packaged into external desktop enclosures or carriers that fit into a robotic tape library.

Sales and market 

In the course of its existence, LTO has succeeded in completely displacing all other low-end/mid-range tape technologies such as AIT, DLT, DAT/DDS, and VXA. And after the exit of Oracle StorageTek T10000 of the high-end market, only the IBM 3592 series is still under active development. LTO also competes against hard disk drives (HDDs), and its continuous improvement has prevented the predicted "death of tape" at the hands of disk.

The presence of five certified media manufacturers and four certified mechanism manufacturers for a while produced a competitive market for LTO products. However, there are only two manufacturers developing media, Sony and Fuji, and only IBM is developing mechanisms.

The LTO organization publishes annual media shipments measured in both units and compressed capacity. In 2017, a record 108,457 petabytes (PB) of total tape capacity (compressed) shipped, an increase of 12.9 percent over the previous year. Cartridge unit shipments decreased to about 18 million units down from a peak of about 27 million units in 2008.

Public information on tape drive sales is not readily available. Unit shipment peaked at about 800,000 units in 2008, but have declined since then to about 400,000 units in 2010, and to less than 250,000 by the end of 2018

As HDD prices have dropped, disk has become cheaper relative to tape drives and cartridges. , at any capacity, the cost of a new LTO tape drive plus one cartridge is much greater than that of a new HDD of the same or greater storage capacity. However, most new tape cartridges still have a lower price per gigabyte than HDDs, so that at very large subsystem capacities, the total price of tape-based subsystems can be lower than HDD based subsystems, particularly when the higher operating costs of HDDs are included in any calculation.

Tape is also used as offline copy, which can be protection against ransomware that cipher or delete data (e.g. tape is pulled out of the tape library, blocked from writing after making copy or using WORM technology). In 2019, many businesses used tape for backup and archiving.

References

External links 
 
 Linear Tape Open Consortium
 IBM's LTO Redbook: IBM System Storage Tape Library Guide for Open Systems
 ECMA-319: Ultrium 1 Format
 IBM LTO Ultrium Cartridge Label Specification, Revision 6

Computer storage tape media
Ecma standards
Tape-based computer storage